Sir George Chalmers, Bart., a native of Edinburgh and a pupil of Allan Ramsay, exhibited portraits at the Royal Academy from 1776 to 1790.

Chalmers, born in Edinburgh, studied in London under Allan Ramsay, son of Allan Ramsay the poet, and later under masters in Italy. His family lost their estates owing to sympathy with the Jacobite cause. He practiced his profession as an artist first in Hull, and afterwards in London, with frequent travels to the Continent. In 1755 he painted at Menorca Edward Cornwallis and the distinguished General William Blakeney, then commanding at Menorca.

He died in London in 1791. He was buried in Old St. Pancras Churchyard on 15 November 1791 next to his wife Dame Isabella Chalmers who had died in 1784. His grave was lost and is not listed on the Burdett Coutts memorial within the churchyard to important graves lost.

References

Attribution:
 

Year of birth unknown
1791 deaths
18th-century Scottish painters
Scottish male painters
Artists from Edinburgh